Abdul Wadud is a retired three-star rank Bangladesh Army officer and present managing director of Summit Power.

Early life and education
Wadud completed his undergraduate degree in engineering from Bangladesh University of Engineering and Technology and graduate and post-graduate degrees in engineering in a university in the United States.

Career

Wadud was the commandant of Military Institute of Science & Technology from 27 March 2000 to 15 February 2001.

From 3 February 2006 to 27 July 2009, Wadud served as the commandant of Military Institute of Science & Technology.

Wadud served as the Principal Staff Officer of the Armed Forces Division in 2009 to 2013. He was the first Vice-Chancellor of Bangladesh University of Professionals. He is a former and Engineer-in-Chief of Bangladesh Army. He was the managing director of Bangladesh Machine Tools Factory. He received Lieutenant General Jagath Jayasuriya of Sri Lanka during his tour of Bangladesh.

In 2013 after retirement Wadud joined as the managing director of Summit Power.

In November 2018, Wadud and 149 retired military officers pledged to work for Awami League before the 11th parliamentary elections in December. In 2019, Wadud received  ICMAB Best Corporate Award on behalf of Summit Group.

References

Living people
Year of birth missing (living people)
Bangladesh Army generals
Engineers in Chief of the Bangladesh Army
Principal Staff Officers (Bangladesh)
Vice-Chancellors of Bangladesh University of Professionals
Bangladesh University of Engineering and Technology alumni
National Defence College, India alumni